William Maunsell Hennessy (1829–1889) was an Irish official and scholar.

Life
Hennessy was born at Castle Gregory, County Kerry. After school education he emigrated to the United States, where he lived for some years. He returned to Ireland and wrote in newspapers, but  concentrated on Irish literature: he was a native speaker. In 1868 he obtained an appointment in the Public Record Office, Dublin. He rose to be the assistant-deputy-keeper, and held office till his death.

Losing his wife and a married daughter, Hennessy suffered from depression. He died in Dublin on 13 January 1889.

Works
Hennessy's major works were editions of Irish texts with introductions and translations. He published in 1866 (Rolls Series) the Chronicon Scotorum of Dubhaltach Mac Fhirbhisigh, a summary of Irish history up to 1150, with a glossary. In 1871 he edited, in two volumes of Irish text and translation, The Annals of Loch Cé, an Irish chronicle, 1014–1590. In 1875, he revised and annotated an edition of The Book of Fenagh, the house-book of St. Caillin's Abbey, County Leitrim; and in 1887 one volume of the Annals of Ulster, carrying the chronicle up to 1056. He translated the Tripartite Life of St Patrick (1871); revised the Pedigree of the White Knight (1856); edited the text of the Poets and Poetry of Munster (Dublin, 1883); translated and added a tract on Cath Cnucha from Leabhar na h-Uidhre, and Mac Conglinne's Dream from Leabhar Breac.

Elected Todd professor at the Royal Irish Academy 1882–4, Hennessy prepared a text and translation of Mesca Ulad, the drunkenness of the Ulstermen, which was published in 1889, immediately after his death; he left another old tale, Bruiden Dáderga, in proof. He wrote an article in La Revue Celtique on the ancient Irish goddess of war, and essays on Ossian and Ossianic literature in The Academy (1 and 15 August 1871). He left with other manuscripts an edition of Edward O'Reilly's Irish Dictionary with additions.

Bibliography

References

External links 
Hennessy, W. M. (ed.) (2012) “Chronicum Scotorum: A Chronicle of Irish Affairs, from the Earliest Times to AD 1135”, Cambridge Library Collection Registration required.
Attribution
 

1829 births
1889 deaths
Members of the Royal Irish Academy
Irish book editors
Irish translators
19th-century translators